The regional park of Grandes-Coulées (in French: Parc régional des Grandes-Coulées) is a regional park of Quebec inaugurated in 2011 and located in the municipalities of Notre-Dame-de-Lourdes, Plessisville (parish) and Villeroy, as well as in City of Plessisville, in L'Érable Regional County Municipality, in the administrative region of Centre-du-Québec, in Quebec, Canada.

The park's raison d'être is to position itself as a place for the practice of outdoor recreational activities and to make its territory accessible and attractive to the population of the L’Érable MRC, but also to visitors.

Administration 
The park is divided into five parts, including two protected areas, the Old Forest and the Great Bog. La Forêt Sauvage and la Plaine are located in Villeroy and are used for nature observation and for snowmobile. The fifth part of the park is the Plessisville tourist office, the Carrefour de l'Érable, which has also served as an information center for the latter since 2012.

Installations 
You can find several trails in each sector, the most comprising 10 km of trails and the second comprising 3 km, including 1.2 km of wooden paving. There are also accommodation facilities, such as shelters, and sanitation facilities. Structures of hebertism have also been established there, such as sets of ropes, in addition to a food court. Several information panels on the park are present.

History 

Following a request from the regional county municipality (MRC), in 2010, the Grandes-Coulées regional park was officially recognized by the Ministry of Municipal Affairs and Housing (MAMH). The park was inaugurated in November 2011 by the L'Érable Regional County Municipality (MRC) in order to develop tourism in its region. The project initially constituted a grouping of five different poles of activity located in Villeroy and Plessisville, passing through a few other villages. These are the Old forest, the Great peat bog, the Forêt sauvage, the Plaine and the Carrefour de l'Érable. In 2018, the coordinator of the MRC de l'Érable, Steve Garneau, let it be known that he wanted to invest  $CAD over the next few years on the redevelopment of the park.

Fauna 
The Grande peatland sector is home to several animal species such as the Field Maubèche and several types of butterfly s such as the willow ( thule). Species potentially present include the Sandhill Crane and Short-eared Owl.

Sports activities 
Sporting activities that are practicable and permitted there include fishing, canicross, cani-VTT, hiking in snowshoes, hiking, running and cycling. Sports equipment is also available for hire. In winter, the park is also used for snowmobiling.

Attendance 
The park is open from sunrise to sunset. The old-growth forest sector is open year-round, while that of the Great peat bog opens from May 1 to October 30. Entrance is free.

See also 
 Regional Park (Quebec)

Notes and references

External links 
 Park details on Tripadvisor.

Protected areas established in 2011
Regional Parks of Quebec
L'Érable Regional County Municipality
Protected areas of Centre-du-Québec